Gaunswala  is a village in Kapurthala district of Punjab State, India. The village is administrated by a Sarpanch, who is an elected representative.

Demography 
According to the report published by Census India in 2011, Gaunswala has a total number of 7 houses and population of 32 of which include 13 males and 19 females. Literacy rate of Gaunswala is 80.00%, higher than state average of 75.84%.  The population of children under the age of 6 years is 7 which is  21.88% of total population of Gaunswala, and child sex ratio is approximately  2500, higher than state average of 846.

Population data

Air travel connectivity 
The closest airport to the village is Sri Guru Ram Dass Jee International Airport.

Villages in Kapurthala

References

External links
  Villages in Kapurthala
 Kapurthala Villages List

Villages in Kapurthala district